Ann Arleklo (born 1953) is a Swedish politician of the Social Democratic Party. She has been a member of the Riksdag since 2006.

External links 
Ann Arleklo at the Riksdag website

1953 births
Living people
People from Jönköping
Members of the Riksdag from the Social Democrats
Women members of the Riksdag
21st-century Swedish women politicians